Gerald Foster (September 30, 1900 – June 13, 1987) was an American painter. His work was part of the painting event in the art competition at the 1932 Summer Olympics.

References

External links

 The Living New Deal

1900 births
1987 deaths
20th-century American painters
American male painters
Olympic competitors in art competitions
People from Westfield, New Jersey
20th-century American male artists
Treasury Relief Art Project artists
Section of Painting and Sculpture artists
American muralists
Public Works of Art Project artists